The South West constituency (No.212) was a Russian legislative constituency in Saint Petersburg from 1993 to 2007. The constituency covered southern Saint Petersburg, as well as the cities of Kolpino and Pavlovsk. In 2016 most of former South West constituency was moved into Southern constituency.

Members elected

Election results

1993

|-
! colspan=2 style="background-color:#E9E9E9;text-align:left;vertical-align:top;" |Candidate
! style="background-color:#E9E9E9;text-align:left;vertical-align:top;" |Party
! style="background-color:#E9E9E9;text-align:right;" |Votes
! style="background-color:#E9E9E9;text-align:right;" |%
|-
|style="background-color:#EA3C38"|
|align=left|Mark Goryachev
|align=left|Civic Union
|
|18.44%
|-
|style="background-color:"|
|align=left|Sergey Andreyev
|align=left|Independent
| -
|14.68%
|-
| colspan="5" style="background-color:#E9E9E9;"|
|- style="font-weight:bold"
| colspan="3" style="text-align:left;" | Total
| 
| 100%
|-
| colspan="5" style="background-color:#E9E9E9;"|
|- style="font-weight:bold"
| colspan="4" |Source:
|
|}

1995

|-
! colspan=2 style="background-color:#E9E9E9;text-align:left;vertical-align:top;" |Candidate
! style="background-color:#E9E9E9;text-align:left;vertical-align:top;" |Party
! style="background-color:#E9E9E9;text-align:right;" |Votes
! style="background-color:#E9E9E9;text-align:right;" |%
|-
|style="background-color:"|
|align=left|Sergey Popov
|align=left|Yabloko
|
|20.28%
|-
|style="background-color:"|
|align=left|Mark Goryachev (incumbent)
|align=left|Independent
|
|14.05%
|-
|style="background-color:"|
|align=left|Vatanyar Yagya
|align=left|Independent
|
|8.27%
|-
|style="background-color:#00A44E"|
|align=left|Pyotr Filippov
|align=left|Bloc '89
|
|8.22%
|-
|style="background-color:"|
|align=left|Yelena Drapeko
|align=left|Independent
|
|7.55%
|-
|style="background-color:"|
|align=left|Vasily Ivanov
|align=left|Union of Patriots
|
|6.31%
|-
|style="background-color:"|
|align=left|Valery Anokhin
|align=left|Liberal Democratic Party
|
|3.39%
|-
|style="background-color:"|
|align=left|Vladimir Shkrabak
|align=left|Agrarian Party
|
|3.36%
|-
|style="background-color:"|
|align=left|Boris Blotner
|align=left|Independent
|
|3.16%
|-
|style="background-color:#1A1A1A"|
|align=left|Valery Bunkin
|align=left|Stanislav Govorukhin Bloc
|
|3.14%
|-
|style="background-color:"|
|align=left|Viktor Pravdyuk
|align=left|Independent
|
|2.94%
|-
|style="background-color:"|
|align=left|Aleksandr Potapov
|align=left|Independent
|
|2.22%
|-
|style="background-color:#DA2021"|
|align=left|Aleksey Pozdyshev
|align=left|Ivan Rybkin Bloc
|
|0.98%
|-
|style="background-color:"|
|align=left|Vladimir Kopeykin
|align=left|Revival
|
|0.96%
|-
|style="background-color:"|
|align=left|Aleksandr Manayev
|align=left|Independent
|
|0.90%
|-
|style="background-color:#000000"|
|colspan=2 |against all
|
|11.32%
|-
| colspan="5" style="background-color:#E9E9E9;"|
|- style="font-weight:bold"
| colspan="3" style="text-align:left;" | Total
| 
| 100%
|-
| colspan="5" style="background-color:#E9E9E9;"|
|- style="font-weight:bold"
| colspan="4" |Source:
|
|}

1999

|-
! colspan=2 style="background-color:#E9E9E9;text-align:left;vertical-align:top;" |Candidate
! style="background-color:#E9E9E9;text-align:left;vertical-align:top;" |Party
! style="background-color:#E9E9E9;text-align:right;" |Votes
! style="background-color:#E9E9E9;text-align:right;" |%
|-
|style="background-color:"|
|align=left|Sergey Popov (incumbent)
|align=left|Yabloko
|
|24.82%
|-
|style="background-color:#FCCA19"|
|align=left|Yury Boldyrev
|align=left|Congress of Russian Communities-Yury Boldyrev Movement
|
|20.49%
|-
|style="background-color:#3B9EDF"|
|align=left|Boris Kiselev
|align=left|Fatherland – All Russia
|
|13.11%
|-
|style="background-color:#D50000"|
|align=left|Yury Terentyev
|align=left|Communists and Workers of Russia - for the Soviet Union
|
|9.89%
|-
|style="background-color:"|
|align=left|Mikhail Ayvazov
|align=left|Independent
|
|4.61%
|-
|style="background-color:"|
|align=left|Gennady Ravdis
|align=left|Independent
|
|2.64%
|-
|style="background-color:"|
|align=left|Nikolay Kuznetsov
|align=left|Liberal Democratic Party
|
|2.03%
|-
|style="background-color:"|
|align=left|Vadim Kuznetsov
|align=left|Independent
|
|1.90%
|-
|style="background-color:"|
|align=left|Mikhail Zlydnikov
|align=left|Our Home – Russia
|
|1.37%
|-
|style="background-color:"|
|align=left|Aleksandr Grigoryev
|align=left|Independent
|
|1.32%
|-
|style="background-color:"|
|align=left|Vladimir Kalashov
|align=left|Independent
|
|0.90%
|-
|style="background-color:#084284"|
|align=left|Vladislav Vinogradov
|align=left|Spiritual Heritage
|
|0.79%
|-
|style="background-color:#020266"|
|align=left|Ivan Kravchenko
|align=left|Russian Socialist Party
|
|0.65%
|-
|style="background-color:"|
|align=left|Andrey Levitsky
|align=left|Independent
|
|0.55%
|-
|style="background-color:#000000"|
|colspan=2 |against all
|
|13.76%
|-
| colspan="5" style="background-color:#E9E9E9;"|
|- style="font-weight:bold"
| colspan="3" style="text-align:left;" | Total
| 
| 100%
|-
| colspan="5" style="background-color:#E9E9E9;"|
|- style="font-weight:bold"
| colspan="4" |Source:
|
|}

2003

|-
! colspan=2 style="background-color:#E9E9E9;text-align:left;vertical-align:top;" |Candidate
! style="background-color:#E9E9E9;text-align:left;vertical-align:top;" |Party
! style="background-color:#E9E9E9;text-align:right;" |Votes
! style="background-color:#E9E9E9;text-align:right;" |%
|-
|style="background-color:"|
|align=left|Sergey Popov (incumbent)
|align=left|Yabloko
|
|29.25%
|-
|style="background-color:#00A1FF"|
|align=left|Viktor Yevtukhov
|align=left|Party of Russia's Rebirth-Russian Party of Life
|
|20.86%
|-
|style="background-color:"|
|align=left|Vadim Voytanovsky
|align=left|Rodina
|
|11.63%
|-
|style="background-color:"|
|align=left|Aleksandr Salayev
|align=left|Independent
|
|11.47%
|-
|style="background-color:"|
|align=left|Svyatoslav Sokol
|align=left|Communist Party
|
|6.46%
|-
|style="background-color:#14589F"|
|align=left|Aleksey Dudevich
|align=left|Development of Enterprise
|
|3.52%
|-
|style="background-color:"|
|align=left|Dmitry Matveyev
|align=left|Independent
|
|2.26%
|-
|style="background-color:"|
|align=left|Oleg Titov
|align=left|Independent
|
|1.17%
|-
|style="background-color:"|
|align=left|Gennady Ravdis
|align=left|Independent
|
|0.81%
|-
|style="background-color:"|
|align=left|Yelena Fomina
|align=left|Independent
|
|0.62%
|-
|style="background-color:#CACBFB"|
|align=left|Vitaly Bronikov
|align=left|Union of People for Education and Science
|
|0.31%
|-
|style="background-color:"|
|align=left|Yury Yakovlev
|align=left|Independent
|
|0.61%
|-
|style="background-color:"|
|align=left|Vadim Sergiyenko
|align=left|Independent
|
|0.25%
|-
|style="background-color:#000000"|
|colspan=2 |against all
|
|10.17%
|-
| colspan="5" style="background-color:#E9E9E9;"|
|- style="font-weight:bold"
| colspan="3" style="text-align:left;" | Total
| 
| 100%
|-
| colspan="5" style="background-color:#E9E9E9;"|
|- style="font-weight:bold"
| colspan="4" |Source:
|
|}

References

Obsolete Russian legislative constituencies
Politics of Saint Petersburg